Surdag is a village in Karak District located in Khyber Pakhtunkhwa, Pakistan.
Zip Code: 27200
Total Papulation: 4200
Male: 2000
Female: 2200
No of School High  : (Male-01,  Female-01)
No of Primary Schools: 01 (F),  01 (M)
 Village Latamber, Rahmat Abad, Bahadar Khel and Shobley Kala are located in West, East, North and South respectively.

Surdag is located at a latitude of 34°18'56.9988" N, and a longitude of 70°13'54.0012" E.

Populated places in Karak District
Karak District